The Beriev R-1 (known in-house as 'product R') was the first Soviet turbojet-powered flying boat.

Design and development
At the end of World War II, design work began on a request from the Soviet Navy for a jet-powered flying boat. Starting with the wing design of the Be-6, Beriev began in-house design work in May 1947, even before the official specifications were issued in June 1948. The specifications called for a radar-equipped aircraft with a three-man crew, capable of a speed of 800 km/h, and with a range of 2000-2500 kilometers. The aircraft was to be armed with 2,000 kg of bombs and four 20 mm cannons.

Beriev completed a mock-up by 10 June 1950, using Klimov VK-1 engines instead of the originally planned Rolls-Royce Nene engines.  The first prototype was completed in November 1951. However, the prototype experienced severe vibrations and hydrodynamic instability at 165 km/hr and was nearly destroyed in testing. After much modification, flight testing began at the end of 1951. The prototype crash landed on 3 October 1953 and was again repaired.

Extensive testing continued to 1956, however, the development of land-based long-range reconnaissance aircraft put the project into jeopardy. After another crash in February 1956, the R-1 was never repaired and subsequently scrapped. The R designation is  believed to have stood for Reaktivnyy (jet-propelled).
Experience gained during the test programme with the R-1 was used in the development of the Beriev Be-10.

Specifications (R-1)

See also

References

Notes

Bibliography

 Yefim Gordon, Andrey Sal'nikov and Aleksandr Zablotskiy (2006) Beriev's Jet Flying Boats. Hinckley, UK: Midland Publishing. 

R-1
Flying boats
1950s Soviet experimental aircraft
Jet seaplanes and flying boats
High-wing aircraft
Gull-wing aircraft
Twinjets
Aircraft first flown in 1952